Dallas Fire Station No. 16, at 5501 Columbia Ave. in Dallas, Texas, was built in 1917.  It was listed on the National Register of Historic Places in 1997.

It is a two-story red brick building designed by architect H.A. Overbeck.  It has a "curvilinear Mission Revival parapet, cast stone geometric detailing, and knee brackets supporting a shed roof with red clay tiles."  It also incorporates Prairie School architecture.

See also

National Register of Historic Places listings in Dallas County, Texas

References

External links

Fire stations on the National Register of Historic Places in Texas
National Register of Historic Places in Dallas County, Texas
Mission Revival architecture in Texas
Prairie School architecture
Buildings and structures completed in 1917